LR or Lr may refer to:

Businesses and organizations
Avianca Costa Rica, an airline, IATA airline code LR
Lenoir–Rhyne University in Hickory, North Carolina
Lenong Regiment, an infantry regiment of the South African Army
The Republicans (France) (Les Républicains), a political party in France
Lloyd's Register, a technical and business services organisation and a maritime classification society

Places
Lithuania (Lietuvos Respublika, LR)
Liberia (ISO 3166-1 alpha-2 country code LR)
.lr, the Internet country code top-level domain for Liberia
Little Rock, Arkansas, United States

Science, technology and mathematics
LR parser, a type of parser in computer science
Lexical resource, a database consisting of one or several dictionaries
Link register, a special purpose register in computer architecture
Adobe Lightroom, photography software program
 L(R) (pronounced L of R), in set theory
Lawrencium, symbol Lr, a chemical element
.22 Long Rifle, a type of rimfire ammunition
Limiting reagent, the reactant that is completely consumed in a chemical reaction

Other uses
Legislative route, a U.S. highway defined by laws passed in a state legislature
Latvijas Radio, a public radio broadcaster in Latvia

See also
Long Range (disambiguation)
Left and right (disambiguation)